Joel Thomas is an artist whose work has appeared in role-playing games.

Career
His Dungeons & Dragons work includes interior art for Underdark (2003), Draconomicon (2003), Complete Warrior (2003), Unearthed Arcana (2004), Serpent Kingdoms (2004), Races of Stone (2004), Stormwrack (2005), Spell Compendium (2005), Tome of Magic (2006), Magic Item Compendium (2007), Rules Compendium (2007), and Martial Power 2 (2010).

He is known for his work on the Magic: The Gathering collectible card game.

References

External links
 Joel Thomas's website
 

Living people
Place of birth missing (living people)
Role-playing game artists
Year of birth missing (living people)